Strbacki buk waterfall is a 25 m high waterfall on the Una River (296 m altitude). It is situated in Croatia and Bosnia and Herzegovina (Una-Sana Canton, city Bihać, settlement Doljani and Celije). It is part of Bosnian and Herzegovinian „Una National Park“.

References

External links
5 Must-see Waterfalls in Bosnia.

Landforms of Croatia
Waterfalls of Bosnia and Herzegovina